The Charlevoix Biosphere Reserve  is part of the Man and the Biosphere Program of the UNESCO. It is managed by the Charlevoix Biosphere Reserve Corporation.

In Canada, the Canadian Commission for UNESCO deals with reservations. In addition, there is also the Canadian Association of Biosphere Reservesé Canada currently has 19 biosphere reserves.

The Charlevoix Biosphere Reserve is one of four Quebec reserves in the UNESCO Canadian biosphere reserve network.

History

Territory 

It covers the territory of the Charlevoix impact structure.
It is found in the administrative boundaries of the Capitale-Nationale region and in the MRCs of Charlevoix Regional County Municipality and Charlevoix-Est.

Central areas 

 Hautes-Gorges-de-la-Rivière-Malbaie National Park
 Grands-Jardins National Park
 Saguenay–St. Lawrence Marine Park
 Grands-Ormes Ecological Reserve
 Thomas-Fortin Ecological Reserve
 Laurentides Wildlife Reserve
 Rivière du Gouffre
 Malbaie River
 Unorganized territory of Lac-Pikauba
 Unorganized territory of Mont-Élie
 Unorganized territory of Sagard

Buffer zone and cooperation area 

Here are the municipalities of the Charlevoix region, at the heart of the cooperation area:
 Baie-Saint-Paul
 Baie-Sainte-Catherine
 Clermont
 L'Isle-aux-Coudres
 La Malbaie
 Les Éboulements
 Notre-Dame-des-Monts
 Petite-Rivière-Saint-François
 Saint-Aimé-des-Lacs
 Saint-Hilarion
 Saint-Irénée
 Saint-Siméon
 Saint-Urbain

Constitution

See also 
 Biosphere Reserves of Canada

External links 
 Official site of the Charlevoix Biosphere Reserve
 Biosphere of Charlevoix - Educational resources for primary and secondary education

Notes and references 

Biosphere reserves of Canada
Charlevoix Regional County Municipality
Charlevoix-Est Regional County Municipality
Protected areas of Capitale-Nationale
Laurentides Wildlife Reserve